The Women's sprint event of the Biathlon World Championships 2016 was held on 5 March 2016.

Results
The race was started at 14:30 CET.

References

Women's sprint
2016 in Norwegian women's sport